Clandestine is the second studio album by Swedish death metal band Entombed, released on 12 November 1991 in Europe and on 11 February 1992 in North America. Along with Entombed's preceding album, Clandestine helped establish a distinctively Swedish sound in the death metal genre. This is the only Entombed album on which original vocalist L.G. Petrov does not appear.

Reception

AllMusic gave Clandestine a rating of four and a half stars. In October 2016, Clandestine was inducted into the Decibel magazine Hall of Fame, becoming the second Entombed album to be featured in the Decibel Hall of Fame.

Track listing

2008 re-issue
Clandestine was re-issued as part of the Earache Classic Series with a DVD. The DVD is identical to their Monkey Puss DVD.

Personnel
Nicke Andersson – drums, vocals, art direction, logo, back cover
Uffe Cederlund – guitar, backing vocals
Lars Rosenberg – bass
Alex Hellid – guitar
Tomas Skogsberg – production, engineering
Entombed – production, engineering
Dan Seagrave – art direction, cover art

Johnny Dordevic is listed on the sleeve as the lead singer, but he does not appear on the album. All vocals were recorded by Nicke Andersson.

References

Entombed (band) albums
1991 albums
Earache Records albums
Albums with cover art by Dan Seagrave